Zaw Min (also spelt Zaw Minn; born 17 July 1949) is a Burmese politician who currently serves as an Amyotha Hluttaw member of parliament for Sagaing Township No. 6 Constituency.

Early life and education
Zaw Minn was born on 17 July 1949 Mogok, Myanmar. He graduated with B.A (Law) from Rangoon University. In 1979–1987, he worked as a lawyer of the Supreme Court of Myanmar at Katha Township, and also worked as merchants at Yangon in 1989s.

Political career
He is a member of the National League for Democracy Party politician, he was elected as Amyotha Hluttaw representative for Sagaing Region No. 6 parliamentary constituency.

References

National League for Democracy politicians
1949 births
Living people
People from Sagaing Region
University of Yangon alumni